Chiu Ting Ronald Lam (born February 13, 1991) is a retired Hong Kong figure skater. He won three senior international medals and three national titles. He competed in the final segment at three ISU Championships, placing 20th at the 2010 World Junior Championships in The Hague, Netherlands; 13th at the 2015 Four Continents Championships in Seoul, South Korea; and 14th at the 2015 World Championships in Shanghai, China. Lam represented Canada before switching to Hong Kong in 2012.

In May 2015, Lam graduated from the University of British Columbia with a Bachelor of Science degree in computer science. He received one Grand Prix assignment, to the 2015 Skate Canada International, but decided not to compete another season. He announced his retirement on July 24, 2015, looking to start a career beyond competitive figure skating.

Programs

Competitive highlights 
CS: Challenger Series; JGP: Junior Grand Prix

For Hong Kong

For Canada

References

External links 

 
 Ronald Lam at Tracings

1991 births
Hong Kong male single skaters
Canadian male single skaters
Living people
Hong Kong emigrants to Canada
Competitors at the 2015 Winter Universiade
Competitors at the 2013 Winter Universiade